Manon Maria Bollegraf (born 10 April 1964) is a former professional tennis player from the Netherlands, who was a quarterfinalist at the singles event of the 1992 French Open, a finalist in doubles at the 1997 Wimbledon Championships, and a four-time mixed doubles Grand Slam champion. She also finished fourth in women's doubles at the 1996 Summer Olympics in Atlanta.

Career
Bollegraf reached her highest ranking on the WTA Tour on 9 July 1990, when she became world No. 29. She won 26 doubles tournaments in her career and her highest WTA doubles ranking was No. 4, achieved on 16 February 1998.

She was a member of the Dutch team that reached the Fed Cup final 1997, losing to France.

Bollegraf won four Grand Slam mixed-doubles titles, the 1989 French Open and the 1991 US Open, both teaming up with Tom Nijssen. Partnering Rick Leach, she won the Australian Open and US Open mixed doubles titles in 1997.

Bollegraf was a member of the Idaho Sneakers Team Tennis with Amy Frazier and Jon Leach; coached by Greg Patton (Boise State University men's tennis coach).

Grand Slam finals

Women's doubles: 1 (runner-up)

Mixed doubles: 6 (4 titles, 2 runner-ups)

Olympic finals

Doubles (0–1)

WTA career finals

Singles: 3 (1 title, 2 runner-ups)

Doubles: 55 (26 titles, 29 runner-ups)

ITF Circuit finals

Singles: 3 (2–1)

Doubles: 6 (4–2)

Grand Slam performance timelines

Women’s Doubles

Mixed doubles

References

External links
 
 
 
 ESPN Profile

1964 births
Living people
Sportspeople from 's-Hertogenbosch
Dutch female tennis players
Australian Open (tennis) champions
French Open champions
Hopman Cup competitors
Olympic tennis players of the Netherlands
Tennis players at the 1996 Summer Olympics
US Open (tennis) champions
Grand Slam (tennis) champions in mixed doubles